Kyrkjeoksli or Kyrkjeoksle is a mountain in Lom Municipality in Innlandet county, Norway. The mountain is surrounded by several other notable mountains including Urdadalstindene, Visbretinden, and Semelholstinden to the east; Langvasshøi to the southeast; Skarddalstinden and Høgvagltindene to the south; Stehøi and Stetinden to the northwest; and Kyrkja, Tverrbottindene, and Tverrbytthornet to the north.

See also
List of mountains of Norway by height

References

Jotunheimen
Lom, Norway
Mountains of Innlandet